Cumberland Island may refer to:

 Cumberland Island, an island in the U.S. state of Georgia
 Cumberland Island (Saskatchewan), an island in Canadian province of Saskatchewan
 Cumberland Islands (Queensland), a group of islands in the Australian state of Queensland
 Cumberland Island horse

See also 
 Cumberland Island National Seashore
 South Cumberland Islands National Park